Ulrik Mathisen (born 15 January 1999) is a Norwegian football midfielder who plays for Sogndal, on loan from Lillestrøm.

References

1999 births
Living people
Footballers from Oslo
Norwegian footballers
Kjelsås Fotball players
Lillestrøm SK players
Norwegian First Division players
Eliteserien players
Association football midfielders
Norway youth international footballers